Karl Records was a United States based record label active in the late 1950s and early 1960s.

History
The Karl label was owned by rockabilly and country singer Clay Eager.  The label specialized in rockabilly music and country and western music.  The label was run out of Springfield, Ohio and London, Ohio.  Eager's father-in-law "Pops" Wood was in charge of the engineering at the studio.

Karl Records artists
 Archie Poe
 Art and The Scioto Rhythm Boys
 Bo Ratliff and Country Kinfolk
 Bobby Bennett
 Charlie Neff and Consecrated Banjo
 Clay Eager
 Deacon Morris
 George Hinkle and The Blue Valley Boys
 Jimmy Bobb and Country Gentlemen
 Johnnie Green with The Green Mountain Boys
 Larry Edwards and Dude Ranch Boys
 Little Dickie Chaffin and Cheyenne Cowboys
 Louie Schertzinger
 Lacy Kirk
 Phyllis Ann
 Ramey Brothers
 Ray King and The Kingsmen
 Sunnie Lee
 Tammy Charles
 Tammy Charles & Clita Raffel
 Von Stephens and The String Dusters

See also
 List of record labels

References

External links
  RCS Discography
  Ohio Local Labels - Karl Records Discography

American country music record labels